Döbrabach (also Döbra) is a small river of Bavaria, Germany.

The creek was first mentioned on April 28, 1386, when the castle Veste Schauenstein was sold to Frederick V, Burgrave of Nuremberg.

The Döbrabach is the name given to both the village Döbra and the mountain Döbraberg.

See also
List of rivers of Bavaria

References

Rivers of Bavaria
Rivers of Germany